The Stolen March is a 1926 fantasy novel by the English author Dornford Yates (Cecil William Mercer), first serialised in The Windsor Magazine.

Plot 
The novel starts credibly enough, with the return of Simon and Patricia Beaulieu (previously seen in "Simon", one of the stories in As Other Men Are). Simon falls ill, and on medical advice the couple take a relaxed caravan holiday, being driving down through France to the fictional country of Etchechuria, lying in the Pyrenees between France and Spain. En route they are joined by Eulalie (previously seen in chapter VIII of Jonah & Co, 1922) and Pomfret Tudor. There, fantastic things start to happen: they are addressed by a mule speaking English, and find themselves in a land peopled by animated illustrations and nursery rhyme characters. The tone becomes darker, and some of the characters start to develop murderous intent.

Background 
Mercer himself loved the book, but recognised that many readers did not, including the editor of The Windsor Magazine. The novel would probably not have been accepted for serialisation had the editor realised at the start where the opening situation would ultimately lead.

Chapters

Critical reception 
Mercer’s autobiographer AJ Smithers, writing in 1982, considered that this book contains some of the author’s best pastoral writing, and that some of it is very funny indeed.

Sequel 
Mercer reported that he had "had a great many requests that I should turn again to Etchechuria" and had begun writing a book entitled The Tempered Wind which had reached fifty-one pages when his "subconscious brain stopped dead" and he eventually abandoned the project.

References

Bibliography

External links
 
 

1926 British novels
Ward, Lock & Co. books
Novels by Dornford Yates
Novels set in fictional countries
British fantasy novels